Enchant may refer to:

 Performing an incantation
 Enchant (band), a progressive rock band
 Enchant (album), a 2003 album by Emilie Autumn
 Enchant (software), a spell-checker

See also

 Enchanted (disambiguation)
 Enchantment (disambiguation)
 Enchantress (disambiguation)
 Enchanter (disambiguation)